Ridgewood Park is a Roanoke, Virginia neighborhood located in far western Roanoke. It borders the neighborhoods of Edgewood-Summit Hills on the north, Cherry Hill on the south and Wilmont on the east. The western border is shared with the city of Salem.

History
Annexed by the city from Roanoke County in 1949, Ridgewood Park is primarily residential in nature. The area features both traditional and suburban characteristics.

References

External links
 Peters Creek South Neighborhood Plan

Neighborhoods in Roanoke, Virginia